The Sijiao Island is the largest island in the Shengsi Islands (嵊泗列岛) with an area of 21.2 km². The island has a subtropical climate with the yearly average temperature of 15.8 °C. It is administrated by Shengsi County (嵊泗县), a part of Zhoushan Prefecture (舟山地区) of China.

Tourism
There are regular ferry lines from Shanghai Wusong, Shiliupu and Luchao Ports operating several times a day.  The average travel time from Shanghai is about 5 hours. The island is a touristic destination offering sea bathing.

References

Islands of Zhejiang
Shengsi Islands